"Save the Best for Last" is a song by American singer and actress Vanessa Williams, released in January 1992 as the third single from her second studio album, The Comfort Zone (1991). The song was written by Phil Galdston, Wendy Waldman, and Jon Lind. It is a ballad about a young female admirer of a single man who stands by and watches as the object of her desires goes through years of dating, before he finally unexpectedly decides to initiate a relationship with the singer. The lyrics' redemptive themes resonated with Williams' story, as she had put together a successful music career following her earlier Miss America resignation scandal.

The song was a commercial and critical success. It topped the US Billboard Hot 100 chart for five weeks, and was ranked fourth on Billboards Top 100 hits of 1992 list, becoming the biggest success of Williams' music career. ASCAP named it Song of the Year in 1992; it was nominated for the Grammy Award for Song of the Year, Record of the Year and Best Female Pop Vocal Performance in 1993. There were produced two different music videos to promote the single.

Composition
The song is performed in the key of E major with a tempo of 96 beats per minute in common time. Williams' vocals span from F3 to C5 in the song.

Commercial performance
The single was Williams's third number-one on the Soul singles chart and topped the US Billboard Hot 100 for five weeks in 1992. "Save the Best for Last" was ranked fourth in the Billboard Top 100 hits of 1992, becoming the biggest success of Williams's music career. The song also went to number one on the US Adult Contemporary and R&B charts; it remained atop these charts for three weeks apiece. Internationally, the single reached number one in Australia and Canada, number two in Ireland, and number three in the United Kingdom and the Netherlands.

ASCAP named it as its Song of the Year, meaning it was performed more than any other song in 1992; it was nominated for the Grammy Award for Song of the Year and Record of the Year in 1993, losing to Eric Clapton's "Tears in Heaven" in both categories.

Critical reception
Upon the release, Larry Flick from Billboard complimented the song as a "nicely orchestrated pop/soul ballad", remarking that it "proves that she is possibly best suited to such soothing fare, as her crystalline voice is caressed by soft and wafting strings. A beautiful offering from the excellent Comfort Zone collection." Clark and DeVaney from Cashbox stated that it is "beautifully sung by Williams and tastefully produced and arranged by Keith Thomas." In his album review, Arion Berger from Entertainment Weekly noted that the singer closes Act One "with the show-stopping happy tears" of "Save the Best for Last". Dave Sholin from the Gavin Report constated that "every artist needs that "career record", and while Vanessa is by now accustomed to chart success, this effort takes her to a whole new level. It deserves to become her biggest hit to-date and it's well on the way with Top Ten status..." Another editor, John Martinucci, felt that Williams "gives this beautiful ballad a simple and delicate presentation that'll lift any romantic spirit." 

A reviewer from The Orlando Sentinel described it as "a sophisticated ballad". R. LaMont Jones Jr. from The Pittsburgh Press named it the album's "centerpiece", calling it "a real-life, down-to-earth song", that Barbra Streisand "will no doubt wish she had been given. But with Williams' soulful delivery, it's hard to imagine anyone doing it better." Steve Pick from St. Louis Post-Dispatch said that "the first thing to notice is that Williams can really sing. I'm talking phrasing and dynamics that could stand up to fine jazz singers. Then, we realize that this is a nice little tune". Jonathan Bernstein from Spin wrote, "Most triumphant of all the year's late bloomers, though, was Vanessa Williams. "Sometimes the snow comes down in June, sometimes the sun goes round the moon...." I tasted salt the first time I ever heard her "Save the Best for Last", and even now I still get a lump." Mike Joyce from The Washington Post felt that the "reflective Wendy Waldman love song" is a more likely candidate for radio exposure.

Retrospective response
In an 2021 retrospective review, Mark Chappelle from Albumism wrote, "In this sweet ditty, Williams observes a parade of bad love choices by a platonic partner before they finally fall in love with each other. Its sound and aesthetic proved perfect for every wedding reception, graduation, prom, and sentimental occasion." AllMusic editor Michael Gallucci declared it as a "glorious ballad", adding that when she is "handed torch songs that emphasized her natural slow burn", Williams is a "genuinely sexy and capable performer." Insider featured "Save the Best for Last" in their list of the "Best Songs from the '90s" in 2019, declaring it as "a gorgeous ballad", that "has stood the test of time."

Music videos
There were produced two versions of the music video to promote the single. The original version of the music video, which primarily aired on MTV, was directed by Ralph Ziman. It begins with Williams walking around in a winter landscape for the first few seconds, then intercuts between black-and-white footage of Williams singing in front of a dark curtain, an orchestra playing along to the blue-tinted footage as it is being projected on a screen, and Williams singing in a living room with candles, a fireplace and a sofa. A "behind the scenes" cut was also later made of the video, which primarily aired on VH1, predominantly zooming on the orchestra scenes and the blue-tinted footage of Williams as well as showcasing footage from the making of the video.

Usage in media
The song was used in the UK in a series of 1990s adverts for Bisto Best gravy granules. The adverts featured slow motion shots of gravy being poured over a roast dinner while the song played in the background.

The track features in the closing credits of the 1994 film The Adventures Of Priscilla, Queen Of The Desert, showing a drag queen lip synching to the original recording.  It is also on the film's original soundtrack album.

Track listings

 UK vinyl, 7-inch
A: "Save the Best for Last" - 3:39
B: "2 of a Kind" - 5:15

 Netherlands 12-inch, promo
A: "Save the Best for Last" - 3:39
B1: "2 of a Kind" - 5:15
B2: "Dreamin'" - 5:25

 Europe single
 "Save the Best for Last" - 3:39
 "2 of a Kind" - 5:15
 "Dreamin'" - 5:25

 US maxi-CD
 "Save the Best for Last" - 3:39
 "Freedom Dance (Get Free!)" (LP Version) - 4:13
 "Freedom Dance (Get Free!)" (Free Your Body Club Mix) - 6:59
 "Freedom Dance (Get Free!)" (Vanessa's Sweat Mix) - 5:21
 "The Right Stuff" (UK Mix) - 6:18

Charts

Weekly charts

Year-end charts

Decade-end charts

Certifications

Release history

Covers
 In 2014, Alexandra Shipp sang the song in the Lifetime television film Aaliyah: The Princess of R&B, a biopic about R&B star Aaliyah, whom Shipp portrays in the film, though Aaliyah never covered the song herself.

Other-language versions
The tune is the basis of Märchenland Gefühl (German: Fairy Tale Feeling) and Iets Heeft je Zachtjes Aangeraakt (Flemish/Dutch: Something you softly touched), both by Belgian artiste Dana Winner. Hong Kong cantopop singer Shirley Kwan also has a Cantonese cover version entitled "Why Us".

See also
 List of number-one R&B singles of 1992 (U.S.)
 List of Hot 100 number-one singles of 1992 (U.S.)
 List of number-one adult contemporary singles of 1992 (U.S.)

References

External links
 SingerUniverse Magazine account of the song's writing
 Save the Best for Last. Discogs.com.

Vanessa Williams songs
1990s ballads
1991 songs
1992 singles
Billboard Hot 100 number-one singles
Mercury Records singles
Number-one singles in Australia
Polydor Records singles
RPM Top Singles number-one singles
Song recordings produced by Keith Thomas (record producer)
Songs written by Jon Lind
Songs written by Phil Galdston
Songs written by Wendy Waldman
Soul ballads
Wing Records singles